Hauteville Castle is a castle in the municipality of Saint-Légier-La Chiésaz of the Canton of Vaud in Switzerland.  It is a Swiss heritage site of national significance.

History
In 1733, Jacques-Philippe d'Herwarth acquired the lands that included the municipalities of Saint-Légier and La Chiésaz.  He merged these lands with the estate in Hauteville which he already owned.  The castle was built on the estate in the 1760s.

Victoire Cannac, heiress of the castle, married Daniel Grand de la Chaise (1761-1828), from a family of Parisian bankers ennobled in 1781. She inherited the estate in 1794. It was then that the young couple decided to take the name of Grand d'Hauteville. The property has since remained in the same family, but at the dawn of the 21st century, however, they decided to get rid of it.

In 2019, Pepperdine University purchased the castle and its 67 acres overlooking Lake Geneva, and after a multi-million euro renovation the university plans to operate the estate as a global conference center and campus for its Switzerland-based study abroad program.

See also
 List of castles in Switzerland
 Château

References

External links

 

Houses completed in the 18th century
Castles in Vaud
Cultural property of national significance in the canton of Vaud
18th-century architecture in Switzerland